Melanie Thomas may refer to:
 Melanie Thomas (bowls)
 Melanie Thomas (EastEnders)
 Mel Thomas, American basketball player